Gummadi Venkateswara Rao (9 July 1927 – 26 January 2010), known mononymously by his surname Gummadi, was an Indian actor and producer, who worked predominantly in Telugu cinema and a few Tamil films. Known as one of the finest method actors, Gummadi starred in around five hundred feature films. He received critical recognition for his work in Thodu Dongalu (1954) and Mahamantri Timmarusu (1962), for which he has received the erstwhile Rashtrapati Award. Gummadi was an official member of the Indian delegation from South India to the Tashkent Film Festival in 1978 and 1982.

Gummadi served as a jury member thrice for the 28th, 33rd and 39th National Film Awards. He served twice on the state Nandi Awards Committee. 

In 1977, he was awarded India's fourth-highest civilian honor Padma Shri for his contributions to Indian cinema. He is widely known for his roles in films such as Mayabazar (1957), Maa Inti Mahalakshmi (1959), Kula Daivam (1960), Kula Gothralu (1962), Jyothi (1976), Nelavanka (1981), Maro Malupu (1982), Ekalavya (1982), Ee Charitra Ye Siraatho? (1982), Gaaju Bommalu (1983) and Pelli Pustakam (1991). 

In 2008, he starred in Jagadguru Sree Kasinayana Charitra, which would be his last film.

Early life
He was born in Ravikampadu in Kollur mandal of Guntur district, in present-day Andhra Pradesh. According to one of his interviews, he studied in ZP High School, Kollur and Hindu College, Guntur.

Early career
Gummadi's acting career extended from 1950 onwards for almost six decades and he worked with three generations of people in the film industry. Though young, he played dignified older people at the beginning. He was a versatile character actor in sociopolitical and mythological movies. He acted in nearly 500 movies. He played the role of father to many lead actors in old Telugu films.

Gummadi Venkateswara Rao first appeared as an actor in 1942, where he played the role of an old man on the stage. He began his cinema career with Adrushtadeepudu (1950) and continued on for about 500 more films portraying roles ranging from the hero, the villain and the character artiste, to roles with a slight comedic bent, such as his guest appearance in Missamma (1955).

Characters played by him

 Balarama
 Bhishma
 Maharishi Bhrigu
 Chief Minister
 Dasharatha
 Diwan
 Durvasa
 Jamadagni
 Kabir
 Karna
 Kasinayana

 Nanda
 Parashurama
 Pothana
 Principal
 Timmarusu
 Vishwamitra
 Yudhishthira
 Zamindar

Personal life

Gummadi was married and had five daughters and two sons. He died of multiple organ failure at Care hospital, Hyderabad on 26 January 2010. His last public appearance was at the screening of Maya Bazar, which had been colourised. Here he expressed his happiness and said, "Watching this great movie in colour probably could have been the only reason for me to have stayed alive for so long."

Written works
Gummadi wrote his memoirs of Telugu cinema in Teepi Gurthulu and Chedu Gnapakalu.

Awards
Civilian honors
Padma Shri - Government of India - 1977 

Rashtrapati Awards
Best acting for Mahamantri Timmarusu (1963)

Nandi Awards
 Raghupathi Venkaiah Award for contribution to Telugu cinema (1998)
 Nandi Award for Best Supporting Actor - Maro Malupu (1982)

Other Honors
1963 - Honorary Doctorate - Potti Sreeramulu Telugu University
1976 - Filmfare Special Award for Excellent Performance - Jyothi and Sita Kalyanam

Selected filmography

See also
 Raghupathi Venkaiah Award

References

External links

gummadi.com

1928 births
2010 deaths
Indian male film actors
Telugu male actors
Tamil male actors
Male actors in Telugu cinema
Male actors in Tamil cinema
Male actors in Hindi cinema
Recipients of the Padma Shri in arts
Film producers from Andhra Pradesh
Nandi Award winners
Filmfare Awards South winners
Recipients of the Rashtrapati Award
20th-century Indian male actors
Deaths from multiple organ failure
Male actors from Andhra Pradesh
People from Guntur district